Emily Steinwall is a Canadian saxophonist and composer. She is most noted as the 2022 winner of the SOCAN Songwriting Prize in the English category for her song "Welcome to the Garden".

She previously toured as a backing vocalist for Alessia Cara, and performed as a solo artist in jazz clubs around Toronto, Ontario, before releasing her full-length debut album Welcome to the Garden in March 2021.

References

21st-century Canadian composers
21st-century Canadian women singers
Canadian jazz saxophonists
Canadian singer-songwriters
Musicians from Toronto
Living people
Year of birth missing (living people)